Biathlon at the 1984 Winter Olympics consisted of three biathlon events. They were held at the Igman - Veliko Polje.  The events began on 11 February and ended on 17 February 1984.

Medal summary

Four nations won medals in biathlon, Norway and West Germany leading the medal table with three medals, one of each type. Eirik Kvalfoss and Peter Angerer each took three medals, also winning one of each type.

Medal table

Events

Participating nations
Twenty-three nations sent biathletes to compete in the events. Below is a list of the competing nations; in parentheses are the number of national competitors. Australia, Costa Rica, Spain and South Korea made their Olympic biathlon debuts.

References

 
1984
1984 Winter Olympics events
1984 in biathlon
Biathlon competitions in Yugoslavia